Alain Bancquart (20 June 1934 – 27 January 2022) was a French composer.

Biography
Bancquart had his musical formation at the Conservatoire de Paris (violin, viola, chamber music, counterpoint, fugue and composition) with Darius Milhaud. He was a violist with the Orchestre National de France until 1973. He became Directeur Musical des Orchestres de Régions at the ORTF (1973–1974), then musical director of the Orchestre National de France (1975–1976).

Since 1967, he had dedicated his compositional work to the study of micro-intervals in a neo-serial approach using quarter-tones, and more recently 16th tones.

Bancquart was married to French poet Marie-Claire Bancquart. He died on 27 January 2022, at the age of 87.

Selected works 
 Five symphonies for large orchestra
 Two concertos for violin
 Partition concertante for cello and ensemble
 Two works for string trio and orchestra
 Two chamber operas
 Three string quartets
 Many pieces for flute
 Many vocal works
 Baroques for viola and orchestra (1973)
 Concerto for viola and orchestra (1965)
 Jeux pour lumière for violin, viola, cello and orchestra (1969)
 Les Tarots d'Ulysse for soprano, tenor and baritone soloists, violin, viola and flute solo, children's chorus, percussion, synthesizers and tape (1984)
 Ma manière d'arbre II: Du lent sommeil des feuilles for viola and 10 instruments (1992)
 Écorces I for violin and viola (published 1968)
 Sonata for viola solo (1983)
 Duo for viola and harp (1985)

References

External links
 Alain Bancquart website 
 A page dedicated to Alain Bancquart 
 
 

1934 births
2022 deaths
20th-century classical composers
21st-century classical composers
French classical composers
French male classical composers
Conservatoire de Paris alumni
Microtonal musicians
Modernism
French classical violists
People from Dieppe, Seine-Maritime
Pupils of Darius Milhaud